The following is a list of prominent politicians belonging to the Naga people.

Naga politicians from Nagaland

Angami Naga 
 Kevichüsa Angami (1903–1990), Member of Parliament, Lok Sabha from Nagaland (1989–1990)
 John Bosco Jasokie (died 2005), Chief Minister of Nagaland (1975; 1980–1982)
 Vizol Koso (1914–2008), First Naga pilot (Royal Indian Air Force during World War II) and Chief Minister of Nagaland (1974–1975; 1977–1980)
 Rokonicha Kuotsü (1946–2019), former Member of Legislative Assembly of Nagaland from Ghaspani-2 Assembly constituency in 1974, 1977, 1982, 1987, 1998 and 2003
 Salhoutuonuo Kruse (b. 1966), The first woman to be elected to the Nagaland Legislative Assembly
 Khriehu Liezietsu (b. 1966), Politician from Northern Angami-I Assembly constituency
 Shürhozelie Liezietsu (b. 1936), Chief Minister of Nagaland (22 February 2017 – 19 July 2017)
 Thepfülo-u Nakhro (1913–1986), Chief Minister of Nagaland (1966–1969)
 Zale Neikha (b. 1976), former member of Nagaland Legislative Assembly from the Southern Angami-II Assembly constituency
 Kiyanilie Peseyie (1941–2017), Former Speaker of Nagaland 
 Viswesül Pusa (1954–2017), Member of Nagaland Legislative Assembly from 1993 to 2013
 Tseilhoutuo Rhütso (b. 1975), Member of Nagaland Legislative Assembly from Kohima Town Assembly constituency
 Neiphiu Rio (b. 1950), Four-time Chief Minister of Nagaland and former Member of Parliament of the Lok Sabha
 Zhaleo Rio (b. 1953), Politician from Ghaspani-2 Assembly constituency
 Vizadel Sakhrie (1943–1995), Former Minister of the Nagaland Legislative Assembly
 Rano M. Shaiza (1928–2015), First women Parliamentarian from Nagaland

 Vikho-o Yhoshü (1952–2019), Former Speaker of the Nagaland Legislative Assembly

Ao Naga 
 P. Shilu Ao (1916–1988), First Chief Minister of the Indian state of Nagaland
 Imkong L Imchen (b. 1950), Member of Nagaland Legislative Assembly
 C. Apok Jamir (b. 1961), Former Member of Parliament, Rajya Sabha
 Metsübo Jamir (b. 1959), Politician from Mokokchung Town Assembly constituency
 Imchalemba (b. 1939), Former Member of Parliament, Lok Sabha
 S. C. Jamir (b. 1931), Former Chief Minister of the Indian state of Nagaland and former Governor of Indian states of Maharashtra and Odisha
 Imtikümzük Longkümer (1967–2018), Politician from Aonglenden Assembly constituency
 Sharingain Longkümer (b. 1981), Speaker of Nagaland Legislative Assembly
 T. Tali (1943–2020), Member of the Nagaland Legislative Assembly from Tuli Assembly constituency in 1977, 1987, 1993, 1998 and 2003
 Temjen Imna Along Longkümer (b. 1980), State President of the Bharatiya Janata Party of Nagaland
 Tongpang Ozüküm (b. 1981), Politician from Angetyongpang Assembly constituency

Chakhesang Naga 
 K. G. Kenye (b. 1960), Former Member of Parliament, Rajya Sabha from Nagaland
 Neiba Kronu (b. 1967), Cabinet Minister in Nagaland Legislative Assembly
 Küzholüzo Nienü (b. 1966), Member of Nagaland Legislative Assembly
 Vamüzo Phesao (1938–2000), Chief Minister of Nagaland (1990–1992)
 Chotisüh Sazo (b. 1962), Former Speaker of the Nagaland Legislative Assembly
 Lhüthiprü Vasa (d. 1993), Former Minister of the Nagaland Legislative Assembly
 Mülhüpra Vero (1934–2020), First Naga member of parliament

Chang Naga 
 C. M. Chang (1942–2020), Former Member of Parliament, Lok Sabha
 H. Chuba Chang (b. 1951), Member of Nagaland Legislative Assembly
 Kejong Chang (b. 1934), Oldest Member of State Legislative Assembly in India.
 P. Chuba Chang (1965–2013), Member of State Legislative Assembly of Nagaland from 1998 to 2003

Konyak Naga 
 Chingwang Konyak (b. 1943), Member of Parliament, Lok Sabha (1980–1984)
 N. Bongkhao Konyak (b. 1977), Politician from Tobu constituency
 Phangnon Konyak (b. 1978), Member of Parliament, Rajya Sabha (2022–present)
 P. Paiwang Konyak (b. 1977), Cabinet Minister in Nagaland Legislative Assembly
 Noke Wangnao (b. 1948), Member of Nagaland Legislative Assembly
 W. Wangyuh (b. 1963), Former Member of Parliament, Lok Sabha

Lotha Naga 
 Mmhonlümo Kikon (b. 1978), Politician from Bhandari Assembly constituency
 Khyomo Lotha (b. 1940), Former Member of Parliament, Rajya Sabha
 T. M. Lotha (1951/1952–2020), Politician from Wokha Assembly constituency
 Yanthungo Patton (b. 1957), Present Home and Deputy Chief Minister of Nagaland

Phom Naga 
 S. Pangnyu Phom (b. 1964), Cabinet Minister in Nagaland Legislative Assembly

Pochury Naga 
 Yitachu (b. 1967), former Member of Nagaland Legislative Assembly

Sangtam Naga 
 K. Asungba Sangtam, (b. 1945), Former Member of Parliament, Lok Sabha
 Kashiho Sangtam (b. 1961), Cabinet Minister in Nagaland Legislative Assembly

Sümi Naga 
 Y. Hewoto Awomi (b. 1953), Former politician from Dimapur-II Assembly constituency
 G. Kaito Aye (b. 1953), Cabinet Minister in Nagaland Legislative Assembly
 K. L. Chishi (b. 1944), Former Chief Minister of Nagaland
 Hokishe Sema (1931–2007), Former Chief Minister of Indian state of Nagaland and former Governor of Indian state of Himachal Pradesh
 Shikiho Sema (b. 1946), Former Member of Parliament, Lok Sabha
 Kihoto Hollohon (1932–2021), Politician from Ghaspani-2 Assembly constituency
 Scato Swu (1924–2014), Former Rajya Sabha Member of Parliament from Nagaland.
 Tokheho Yepthomi (b. 1956), Member of Parliament, Lok Sabha
 H. Khekiho Zhimomi (1946–2015), Former Member of Parliament, Rajya Sabha
 Jacob Zhimomi (b. 1980), Minister in Nagaland Legislative Assembly

Zeliangrong Naga 
 T. R. Zeliang (b. 1952), Former Chief Minister of Nagaland
 Neiba Ndang (b. 1954), Former Speaker of Nagaland Legislative Assembly
 Vatsu Meru, Member of Nagaland Legislative Assembly from 2003–2008

Naga politicians from Manipur

Anāl Naga 
 B.D. Behring (b. 1946), Former Member of Parliament, Rajya Sabha

Lamkang Naga 
 Olish Shilshi (b. 1977), Member of Manipur Legislative Assembly

Mao Naga 
 Losii Dikho (born 1966), Served as Cabinet Minister for PHE Manipur from 2017–2022
 Lorho S. Pfoze (b. 1960), Member of Parliament, Lok Sabha representing Outer Manipur
 N. Kayisii (b. 1966), National People's Party legislative leader in Manipur Assembly

Maram Naga 
 Francis Ngajokpa, (b. 1964), Former Minister in Manipur Legislative Assembly.

Maring Naga 
 W Morung Makunga (b. 1955), former Minister in Manipur Legislative Assembly
 D Korungthang (b. 1961), former Minister in Manipur Legislative Assembly

Poumai Naga 
 Soso Lorho (1939–2018), Former Minister in Manipur Legislative Assembly
 D D Thaisii (b. 1962), Former Minister in Manipur Legislative Assembly.
 J Kumo Sha (b. 1982), Member of Manipur Legislative Assembly representing Karong Constituency.

Tangkhul Naga 
 Alfred Kan-Ngam Arthur (b. 1976), Congress politician who represented Ukhrul Assembly constituency from 2017 to 2022
 Rishang Keishing (1920–2017), Served as Chief Minister of Manipur from 1980 to 1988 and from 1994 to 1997
 Leishiyo Keishing (b. 1974), Member of Manipur Legislative Assembly from Phungyar Assembly constituency
 Ram Muivah (b. 1960), Member of Manipur Legislative Assembly representing Ukhrul Assembly constituency
 Yaronsho Ngalung (b.1978), Caretaker Chairman of Autonomous District Council of Ukhrul
 Hangmila Shaiza (1920–1997), First Naga woman legislator
 Yangmaso Shaiza (1923–1984), Served as the fourth Chief Minister of Manipur and the first from the hill regions to hold the post
 MK Preshow Shimray (b. 1966), former deputy speaker of Manipur Legislative Assembly
 Khashim Vashum (b. 1964), Cabinet Minister in Manipur Legislative Assembly

Zeliangrong Naga 
 Mani Charenamei (b. 1959), Former Member of Parliament, Lok Sabha
 Dinganglung Gangmei (b. 1979), Chairman of Hill Area Committee in Manipur Legislative Assembly
 Gaikhangam Gangmei (b. 1950), Congress Working Committee member and former Deputy Chief Minister of Manipur
 Gangmumei Kamei (1939–2017), Founder of Federal Party of Manipur
 Samuel Jendai Kamei (b. 1959), politician who represented Tamenglong Assembly constituency from 1995–2002 and 2017–2020.
 Meijinlung Kamson (b. 1939), Former Union Minister of State for Home Affairs
 Awangbow Newmai (born 1968), Cabinet Minister for Water Resources of Manipur
 Kikhonbou Newmai, Former Member of Manipur Legislative Assembly
 Janghemlung Panmei (b. 1977), Member of Manipur Legislative Assembly representing Tamenglong Assembly constituency

Naga politicians from Arunachal Pradesh

Nocte Naga 
 Wangki Lowang (b. 1962), Cabinet Minister in Arunachal Pradesh Legislative Assembly
 Wangcha Rajkumar (1965–2007), Former Member of parliament from Arunachal Pradesh
 James Lowangcha Wanglat (b. 1950), Former Cabinet Minister in Arunachal Pradesh Legislative Assembly
 Wanglin Lowangdong (b. 1956), Member of Arunachal Pradesh Legislative Assembly
 Wanglam Sawin (b. 1969), Member of Arunachal Pradesh Legislative Assembly
 Tirong Aboh (1978–2019), Member of Arunachal Pradesh Legislative Assembly from 2014–19
 Chakat Aboh (b. 1974), Member of Arunachal Pradesh Legislative Assembly
 T. L. Rajkumar, Former Member of Arunachal Pradesh Legislative Assembly

Tangsa Naga 
 Kamlung Mossang (b. 1962), Cabinet Minister in Arunachal Pradesh Legislative Assembly
 Setong Sena (1964–2015), Former Speaker of Arunachal Pradesh Legislative Assembly
 Laisam Simai (b. 1975), Member of Arunachal Pradesh Legislative Assembly
 Phosum Khimhun (b. 1960), Member of Arunachal Pradesh Legislative Assembly

Tutsa Naga 
 Tesam Pongte (b.1976), Member of Arunachal Pradesh Legislative Assembly
 Wangnia Pongte (1953–2013), Former Minister of Arunachal Pradesh Legislative Assembly

Wancho Naga 
 Noksong Boham (1948–2019), Former Minister in Arunachal Pradesh Legislative Assembly
 Newlai Tingkhatra (1953–2014), Former Cabinet Minister in Arunachal Pradesh Legislative Assembly
 Honchun Ngandam (b. 1966), Cabinet Minister in Arunachal Pradesh Legislative Assembly
 Tanpho Wangnaw (b. 1966), Member of Arunachal Pradesh Legislative Assembly
 Gabriel Denwang Wangsu (b. 1962), Member of Arunachal Pradesh Legislative Assembly

Naga politicians from Assam

Zeme Naga

Naga politicians from Myanmar (Burma) 

 Htet Naung (b. 1984), Parliamentarian representing Lahe Township in Pyithu Hluttaw (House of Representatives)

 Kyaw Htay (b. 1977), Parliamentarian representing Leshi Township in Pyithu Hluttaw (House of Representatives)

 Min Naing (b. 1963), Parliamentarian representing Sagaing Region 12 in Amyotha Hluttaw (House of Nationalities)

 Won Hla (b. 1978), Parliamentarian representing Nanyun Township in Pyithu Hluttaw (House of Representatives)

See also
 List of Naga people

References

Naga-related lists
Naga politicians
Naga people